Frank Adam Trechock (December 24, 1915 – January 16, 1989) was a shortstop in Major League Baseball. He played for the Washington Senators.

References

External links

1915 births
1989 deaths
Major League Baseball shortstops
Washington Senators (1901–1960) players
Baseball players from Pennsylvania